V8 was an Argentine heavy metal band formed in 1979, one of the first notable Argentine and Latin America  bands of that genre. After its dissolution former members have continued their careers starting other heavy metal bands, Hermética, Horcas, Rata Blanca, Logos and Almafuerte.

History 
In the beginning of the 80s, bass player Ricardo Iorio got together some other metal fans and they called themselves V8, whose early influences were Deep Purple, Judas Priest, Led Zeppelin, Motörhead, Budgie, the Sex Pistols and Black Sabbath. Their first album was the first real piece of Argentine Metal, full in the raw style of their idols. They had much internal trouble, but managed to bring out another classic album in 1984.

Their problems with drugs, alcohol and unprofessionalism got bigger, and they changed their drummer and guitar player twice. Under pressure of the record company, they recorded a third album, which became another classic in Argentine metal history. At this time, three of the members converted to Christianity, and were even preaching on stage. This signified the end of the band.

Their cult status in Argentina comes not only from the songs they have written, but also because after the dissolution of the band in 1987, its members formed their own groups: Osvaldo Civile created Horcas, Alberto Zamarbide, Miguel Roldán and Adrián Cenci formed Logos and Gustavo Rowek and Walter Giardino created Rata Blanca. Bass player Ricardo Iorio formed Hermética in 1987, together with Antonio Romano at guitars, Fabián Spataro in drums and Claudio O'Connor for vocals. In 1996 some of the old members came together for one live show, but Iorio was missing. At this concert the CD Homenaje was recorded.

After Civile's death, there were still releases under the name V8. For a tribute album Iorio and the others went different ways. Iorio released the No Esta Muerto Quien Pelea tribute, recorded only with underground bands from all over Argentina. "Nems" records released "V8 No Murio", which was recorded with known names from all over Latin America. The limited edition digipak of this album has the No Se Rindan best of album as bonus CD and a thick booklet. Both tributes have different versions. The Antologia boxed set was released in 2001 and contains all 3 albums and one extra CD with unreleased material. Included is also an extensive booklet, full of photos. The band's records have become rare and now command high prices. There are also some live CD bootlegs circulating. In April 2014, an official V8 box set with the complete discography by the original 80s members was released.

Members

Final members 
 Ricardo Iorio – bass (1979–1987), vocals (1979–1982)
 Alberto Zamarbide – vocals (1982–1987)
 Adrian Cenci – drums (1985–1987)
 Miguel Roldán – guitars (1985–1987)

Past members 
 Gerardo Osemberg – drums (1979–1981)
 Ricardo "Chofa" Moreno – guitars (1979–1982)
 Alejandro Colantonio – drums (1981–1982)
 Osvaldo Civile – guitars (1982–1985)
 Gustavo Rowek – drums (1982–1985)
 Walter Giardino – guitars (1985)
 Gustavo Andino – drums (1985)
 Guillermo Venuto – drums (1985)

Timeline

Discography

Studio albums 
Demos (1982)
Luchando Por El Metal (1983)
Un Paso Mas En La Batalla (1985)
El Fin De Los Inicuos (1986)

Live albums 
Homenaje: Obras/MCMXCVI (1996)

Compilations 
No Se Rindan (1991)
Antología (2001)

See also 
Argentine rock
Pappo
Hermética
Almafuerte (band)
Ricardo Iorio

External links 

 
 Band's Biography at rock.com.ar

Musical groups established in 1982
Musical groups disestablished in 1987
Argentine heavy metal musical groups
Christian metal musical groups
Musical groups from Buenos Aires
1982 establishments in Argentina